The Chaldean Syriac Assyrian Popular Council (CSAPC), popularly known as Motwa, is a political party in Iraq, that was founded in 2007, on the initiative of Sarkis Aghajan, a high-ranking member of the Kurdistan Democratic Party. As a party that represents minority communities, CSAPC participated in several elections, both on national, regional and local levels, mainly in various coalitions with other minority parties. The current president of the party is Shamsuddin Georgis Zaya.

The party was established in order to represent political interests of Christian minority communities in Iraq. Attempting to overcome internal divisions among those communities, the party was founded under a complex name, that refers to Chaldeans (adherents of the Chaldean Catholic Church), Syriacs (adherents of the Syriac Orthodox Church) and Assyrians (adherents of the Assyrian Church of the East). One of the main goals of CSAPC is to achieve administrative self-government or outright autonomy for the Nineveh Plains, a northern Iraqi region with high concentration of Christian population. The party claims the majority of the population in the Nineveh Plains suffers neglect and lack of service because they belong to minority groups, whose rights are not fully observed.

The Party runs Ishtar TV and publishes several different monthly magazines.

The party is closely affiliated with the Kurdistan Democratic Party.

Results
In the January Iraqi governorate elections of 2009, the party was part of a coalition that won the Assyrian reserved seats in Baghdad and Ninawa. It officially backed the Chaldean Democratic Union for the Basra seat, which the CDU won.

On July 25, 2009, the party ran for the first time on its own for the 111-member Kurdistan National Assembly (see 2009 Iraqi Kurdistan legislative election). It received over 10,000 votes and won 3 of the 5 reserved Christian seats.

On March 7, 2010, Iraq held its parliamentary elections, where the party won 2 of the 5 reserved seats. The coalition maintained their seats during the 2014 parliamentary elections.

Military wing
The Nineveh Plain Guard Forces (NPGF) is composed of former members of the Church Guards that was forced to disband and disarm in 2014 as Kurdish officials began confiscating weapons that belonged to local Assyrians prior to the ISIS invasion that left the Assyrians defenceless.

It's estimated that they currently have 1,500 Assyrian soldiers under Peshmerga command

See also

References

Sources

External links
 Ishtar TV

Political parties of minorities in Iraq
Conservative parties in Iraq
Ankawa
Assyrian nationalism
Assyrian political parties
Assyrians in Iraq
Christian democratic parties in Asia
Political parties in Kurdistan Region